Édouard Goubert (29 July 1894 – 14 August 1979) was mayor and first chief minister of Pondicherry between 1 July 1963 and 11 September 1964. Initially a strongly pro-French leader, he later shifted towards the pro-merger Indian National Congress, which ultimately became the death knell for the sovereignty of France's comptoirs (trading posts) in India. He and Lambert Saravane founded the French India Socialist Party in July 1947.

Goubert was popularly known as pappa Goubert.

Early life and career
Goubert was born in Pondicherry on 29 July 1894 to a French father and Franco-Indian mother. He received his education in French Indochina and studied Law in France. He began his career in the colonial administration and worked as a clerk at the Pondicherry Court. In 1951, he ran as a candidate of the Democratic and Socialist Union of the Resistance for the seat of French India in the French National Assembly (Assemblée Nationale). Goubert won the election with an overwhelming majority of 99.3% of the vote.

A referendum on the future of French India was held in Chandernagore, the territory right outside of Calcutta, on 19 June 1949. Out of 12,184 registered voters (drawn from a population of 44,500), 7,473 voted for merger with India while only 114 votes were cast in favor of inclusion in the French Union. While a similar referendum was supposed to be held in the remaining four territories, those referendums never took place. 

Initially, Goubert attempted to negotiate a special status for French India that would make it autonomous from both France and India. However, neither the French nor Indian governments agreed to the demand. By 1954, Goubert shifted his loyalty towards the pro-India faction and supported the annexation of French possessions to the Indian Union. In March 1954, he traveled to Pondicherry and took part in an agitation demanding the merger of French India with the Indian Union. On 29 June 1954, his parliamentary immunity was abolished. On 1 November 1954, France signed treaties transferring sovereignty of French possessions to India, ending Goubert's tenure in the French National Assembly.

Death
Edouard Goubert died in Asho in Bangalore district, Karnataka on 14 August 1979.

See also
 Coup d'état of Yanaon
 Puducherry Legislative Assembly
 Municipal administration in French India

References

External links

 Édouard Goubert biography – French National Assembly

1894 births
1979 deaths
Puducherry politicians
Indian people of French descent
People of French India
Democratic and Socialist Union of the Resistance politicians
Indian National Congress politicians from Puducherry
Deputies of the 2nd National Assembly of the French Fourth Republic
Chief ministers from Indian National Congress
Chief ministers of Puducherry
Puducherry MLAs 1963–1964